Angelo Di Castro (12 December 1925 – 3 June 2012) was an Italian sculptor. His work was part of the sculpture event in the art competition at the 1948 Summer Olympics.

References

1925 births
2012 deaths
20th-century Italian sculptors
20th-century Italian male artists
Italian male sculptors
Olympic competitors in art competitions
Artists from Rome